Cnephasitis apodicta is a species of moth of the family Tortricidae. It is found in Burma and Shanxi, China.

Subspecies
Cnephasitis apodicta apodicta (Upper Burma)
Cnephasitis apodicta palaearctica Razowski, 1984 (China: Shanxi)

References

Moths described in 1974
Polyorthini